The Michaels–Stern Building is a historic industrial and commercial building located at 87 North Clinton Avenue in Rochester, Monroe County, New York.

Description and history 
It is a seven-story, rectangular brick structure with Beaux Arts details. It was built in 1893 for Michaels, Stern, and Company, a manufacturer of ready-to-wear apparel. The building served as manufacturing, office, wholesale and retail functions for the firm until they closed in 1977.

It was listed on the National Register of Historic Places in 1985.

References

External links
University of Rochester-Michaels–Stern Co. papers finding aid

Commercial buildings in Rochester, New York
Commercial buildings on the National Register of Historic Places in New York (state)
Beaux-Arts architecture in New York (state)
Commercial buildings completed in 1893
Industrial buildings and structures on the National Register of Historic Places in New York (state)
National Register of Historic Places in Rochester, New York
Textile mills in New York (state)
Industrial buildings and structures in Rochester, New York